Scott Caldwell (born March 15, 1991) is an American professional soccer player who plays for Real Salt Lake in Major League Soccer.

Career

Youth, college and amateur
Caldwell spent a year with the New England Revolution academy, making six appearances in 2008-09 while rehabbing injuries.  On February 9, 2009, it was announced that Caldwell committed to the University of Akron.  In his freshman year, Caldwell made 19 appearances and went 2-for-2 in penalty kicks at the College Cup.  In 2010, he made 24 appearances and scored five goals, including a game winner in the NCAA College Cup final against Louisville to capture the school's first ever national title in any sport.  He also recorded an assist that year and was named Most Outstanding Offensive Player at the College Cup and Academic All-MAC.  In his junior year, Caldwell finished first on the team in assists and second in points.  He made 23 appearances and finished the year with six goals and 11 assists on his way to being named NSCAA All-America Third Team, CoSIDA Academic All-America Second Team, First Team All-MAC, Academic All-MAC and All-Ohio team.  In his senior year, he led the team in points with 28.  Appearing in 22 games and scoring nine goals and 10 assists on his way to being named NSCAA All-America First Team, NSCAA All-American Scholar Player of the Year, Mid-American Conference Player of the Year, Soccer America MVP First Team, Top Drawer Soccer's Team of the Season First Team, CoSIDA Academic All-America First Team, All-MAC First Team and Academic All-MAC.

During his college years, Caldwell also played in the USL Premier Development League for the Michigan Bucks, the Central Jersey Spartans and the Akron Summit Assault.

Professional
On December 21, 2012, Caldwell signed with MLS club New England Revolution the second Homegrown Player in club history.  He made his professional debut for the club on March 16, 2013, in a 1-0 defeat on the road against the Philadelphia Union.

at the end of the 2021 MLS Season Caldwell's contract was not picked up after nine years at the Revolution. As of January 12, 2022, he is a free agent. His last appearance for the club was October 20 with an 89th-minute substitution in a 2–3 win on the road at DC United. His last start for the club was also a 2–3 win away to Chicago Fire on September 22.

On January 12, 2022, Caldwell signed as a free agent with Real Salt Lake on a two-year deal.

Personal
His father Larry Caldwell played for the Rhode Island Oceaneers
in the American Soccer League in 1974, as well as for the Hartford Bicentennials in the North American Soccer League in 1975.

Career statistics

Club

Honors

Individual
New England Revolution Most Valuable Player: 2015

University of Akron
NCAA College Cup (1): 2010
MAC Conference Tournament Champions (3): 2009, 2010, 2012
MAC Conference Regular Season Champions (4): 2009, 2010, 2011, 2012

New England Revolution
 Supporters' Shield: 2021

References

External links
 
 University of Akron bio

1991 births
Living people
Sportspeople from Weymouth, Massachusetts
American soccer players
Akron Zips men's soccer players
Flint City Bucks players
Central Jersey Spartans players
Akron Summit Assault players
New England Revolution players
Association football midfielders
Soccer players from Massachusetts
USL League Two players
Major League Soccer players
United States men's youth international soccer players
All-American men's college soccer players
NCAA Division I Men's Soccer Tournament Most Outstanding Player winners
Homegrown Players (MLS)
Real Salt Lake players